Shinji Sato (佐藤 信二 Satō Shinji, February 8, 1932 – May 3, 2016) was a Japanese politician who served as a member of the House of Representatives (1979–2000 and 2003–2005) and House of Councillors (1974–1979), as Minister of International Trade and Industry (1996–1997), and as Minister of Transport (1988–1989). He was the second son of Prime Minister Eisaku Sato.

Sato announced in 2012 that he had a document signed between his father and U.S. President Richard Nixon that would allow American nuclear weapons to be brought to Okinawa in emergencies.

References 

2016 deaths
1932 births
Politicians from Yamaguchi Prefecture
Keio University alumni
Grand Cordons of the Order of the Rising Sun
Ministers of Transport of Japan
20th-century Japanese politicians
Liberal Democratic Party (Japan) politicians
Children of prime ministers of Japan